This is a list of heads of state of the Federal Republic of Central America from its founding in 1821/1823 until its dissolution in 1840.

Heads of State

Superior Political Chiefs

First Triumvirate

Second Triumvirate

Presidents

Political parties

See also
Federal Republic of Central America

References

List
Central America, Federal Republic